Crotalus stephensi is a venomous pitviper species found in central and southern Nevada and adjacent California. Common names include panamint rattlesnake, panamint rattler, Owens Valley rattler, and tiger rattlesnake (not to be confused with C. tigris).

Etymology
The specific name, stephensi, is in honor of Frank Stephens (1849–1937), curator emeritus of the San Diego Society of Natural History.

Description

According to Klauber (1936), this species is characterized by the absence of the vertical light line on the posterior edge of the prenasal and first supralabial scales. The supraocular scales are pitted, sutured, or with the outer edges broken.

The color pattern consists of a straw, tan, buff, brown, or gray ground color, overlaid with a series of buff, gray, brown, or deep red-brown blotches. Often, gray suffusions occur on the sides of the body and head, and a scattering of black-tipped scales occur on the back, especially at the edges of the blotches.

Geographic range
Crotalus stephensi is found in desert-mountain areas of the eastern slopes of the Sierra Nevada from Mono County, California, east to Nye County, Nevada, south through southwestern Nevada, southeast to Clark County, Nevada, and southwest to central San Bernardino County, California at  altitude.

Feeding
The diet of C. stephensi consists of small mammals, lizards, and birds.

Reproduction
Crotalus stephensi is ovoviviparous, and the young are born in July and August. Neonates are about 25 cm in total length.

See also
 Snakebite

References

Further reading
Klauber LM (1930). "New and Renamed Subspecies of Crotalus confluentus Say, with Remarks on Related Species". Trans. San Diego Soc. Nat. Hist. 6 (3): 95-144. (Crotalus confluentus stephensi, new subspecies, pp. 108–111).
Klauber LM (1936). Crotalus mitchellii, the Speckled Rattlesnake". Trans. San Diego Soc. Nat. Hist. 8 (19): 149-184. (Crotalus mitchellii stephensi, new combination, pp. 162–166).

External links
 

stephensi
Snakes of North America
Reptiles of the United States
Fauna of California
Fauna of the Mojave Desert
Fauna of the Great Basin
Fauna of the Sierra Nevada (United States)
Fauna of the Southwestern United States
Death Valley National Park
Panamint Range
Natural history of Nye County, Nevada
Taxa named by Laurence Monroe Klauber